Jason Michael Carroll (born June 13, 1978) is an American country music artist. After being discovered at a local talent competition in 2004, Carroll was signed to the Arista Nashville label in 2006, releasing his debut album Waitin' in the Country that year. This album has produced three consecutive Top 40 country hits for him on the Billboard Hot Country Songs charts: "Alyssa Lies", "Livin' Our Love Song" and "I Can Sleep When I'm Dead". Carroll's second album, Growing Up Is Getting Old, has also produced his fourth and fifth Top 40 hits. Carroll and Arista Nashville parted ways in February 2010.

Life and career
Carroll grew up in a religious household in Youngsville, North Carolina. His father (James P. Carroll) was a conservative Christian minister who viewed modern music as sinful and would not allow any secular music played in the home, or even on family trips in the car. His father went so far as to spank him when he found a copy of Billy Ray Cyrus' "Achy Breaky Heart" in his bedroom.

In 2004 encouraged by his mother (Pamela Clark Carroll), Carroll won a local singing competition, WRAZ FOX 50's Gimme the Mic. During this same period, Carroll had finished writing "Alyssa Lies." Carroll says he struggled to the point of getting migraines for a year and a half before finishing the song. By the summer of 2005, Carroll was a regular along Nashville's Music Row.  He later signed with the booking agency Monterey Peninsula Artists Nashville and entered a recording agreement with Arista Nashville.

Musical career

Waitin' in the Country
Carroll's debut album, Waitin' in the Country, produced by Don Gehman, was released on February 6. In its opening week, it debuted at No. 1 on the Billboard Top Country Albums Charts. With first-week sales of 57,608, and a Billboard 200 pop chart entry at No. 8, Carroll had once achieved both the best unit sales and the highest pop chart debut by a new country male artist since Billy Ray Cyrus in 1993. The debut single from Waitin' in the Country, entitled "Alyssa Lies", reached No. 5 on the Hot Country Songs charts. It was followed by "Livin' Our Love Song" which peaked at No. 6. The album's third single, "I Can Sleep When I'm Dead", was released in early 2008 and peaked at No. 21.

Growing Up Is Getting Old
His fourth single, "Where I'm From" entered the charts in November 2008. It is the first single from his second album, Growing Up Is Getting Old, which was released by Arista Nashville on April 28, 2009. The single charted to No. 11 on the country charts, and a second single, "Hurry Home", was issued in June 2009. Shortly after "Hurry Home" peaked, Carroll parted ways with Arista Nashville.

Numbers
His sixth single "Numbers" was officially released to radio on March 28, 2011. It is the first single from his third album, also titled Numbers, which was released by QuarterBack/GrassRoots/Cracker Barrel partnership and sold exclusively through Cracker Barrel stores.

What Color Is Your Sky

Carroll released his fourth studio album What Color Is Your Sky on May 4, 2015.

Strings (Official Movie Soundtrack)

Carroll released his fifth studio album Strings (Official Movie Soundtrack) in 2019. A Movie Starring Carroll was released in the same year following a DVD release.

Personal life
Jason Michael Carroll is currently married to Wendy Carroll (née Phillips). The couple has one son, Jason Weldon. Carroll also has three children from a previous marriage: Gavin Michael, Savanna Nicole, and Stori Paige.

Discography

Studio albums

EPs

Singles

A"I Can Sleep When I Dead" did not enter the Hot 100, but peaked at number 15 on Bubbling Under Hot 100 Singles.

Music videos

References

External links
Carroll's official web site

1978 births
American country singer-songwriters
Arista Nashville artists
Living people
Country musicians from North Carolina
Musicians from Houston
People from Youngsville, North Carolina
Musicians from Raleigh, North Carolina
Singer-songwriters from North Carolina
Singer-songwriters from Texas
21st-century American singers
Country musicians from Texas